Erik Victor Larsson (14 May 1888 – 23 August 1934) was a Swedish policeman who won a gold medal in the tug of war competition at the 1912 Summer Olympics.

References

1888 births
1934 deaths
Olympic gold medalists for Sweden
Olympic tug of war competitors of Sweden
Tug of war competitors at the 1912 Summer Olympics
Olympic medalists in tug of war
Medalists at the 1912 Summer Olympics